The Nomenclature of Territorial Units for Statistics (NUTS) is a geocode standard for referencing the administrative division of Denmark for statistical purposes. The standard is developed and regulated by the European Union. The NUTS standard is instrumental in delivering the European Union's Structural Funds. The NUTS code for Denmark is DK and a hierarchy of three levels is established by Eurostat. Below these is a further levels of geographic organisation - the local administrative unit (LAU). In Denmark, the LAU 1 are municipalities and the LAU 2 is Parishes.

Overall

NUTS codes

Local administrative units
Below the NUTS levels, the two LAU (Local Administrative Units) levels are:

The LAU codes of Denmark can be downloaded here:

NUTS codes

Before 2003
In the 2003 version, before the counties were abolished, the codes were as follows:

See also
 Administrative divisions of Denmark
 FIPS region codes of Denmark
 ISO 3166-2 codes of Denmark

References

Sources
 Hierarchical list of the Nomenclature of territorial units for statistics - NUTS and the Statistical regions of Europe
 Overview map of EU Countries - NUTS level 1
 Overview map of EU Countries - Country level
 Overview map of EU Countries - NUTS level 1
 Correspondence between the NUTS levels and the national administrative units
 List of current NUTS codes
 Download current NUTS codes (ODS format)
 Regions of Denmark, Statoids.com

Denmark
Nuts